Alberto Santiago Lovell (23 April 1912–17 March 1966), known as Alberto Lovell, was an Argentine heavyweight boxer, who won the gold medal in the Olympic Games in Los Angeles 1932. In his career as a professional boxer he had 88 fights winning 76 (55 by KO) losing 8 (2 by KO) with 3 draws, He won both the Argentine and South American championships.

Gold Medal in 1932
Alberto Lovell, age 20, won the gold medal in the heavyweight category at the Olympic Games in Los Angeles 1932 . There were only six competitors in the heavyweight division. In the first round (a quarterfinal), Lovell eliminated the Finn Gunnar Barlund, and then Canadian George Maughan in the semifinals by TKO.

The final was held on 13 August with Lovell defeating the Italian Luigi Rovati, winning by knockout. Alberto Lovell's brother, William, attained the heavyweight silver medal in 1936.  His son, Alberto Santiago, reached the heavyweight quarterfinals in Tokyo in 1964 also in the heavyweight classification.

Career
After becoming professional, he became the Argentine and South American heavyweight champion on 19 November 1938. The title was taken off of him by the Asociación Argentina de Box on 7 July 1953 as he had not defended it since 1944.

His first professional fight was against Eduardo Primo on 20 January 1934, losing by technical knockout. Santiago Lovell also beat Red Burman and Maxie Rosenbloom. His last fight was against Archie Moore in the Luna Park in Buenos Aires on 7 July 1951.

Personal life
His brother and son were also heavyweight boxers. Guillermo Lovell, his brother, won the silver medal at the 1936 Berlin Olympics. Santiago Alberto Lovell Jr, reached the quarter-finals in Tokyo 1964 Olympic Games.

See also
Sport in Argentina
Boxing
Argentina at the Olympics

External links
 profile
 
 CBZ page
 sports-reference
 Photo of Lovell & trainer

1912 births
1966 deaths
Heavyweight boxers
Olympic boxers of Argentina
Boxers at the 1932 Summer Olympics
Olympic gold medalists for Argentina
Medalists at the 1932 Summer Olympics
Afro-Argentine sportspeople
Sportspeople from Buenos Aires Province
People from Avellaneda Partido
Olympic medalists in boxing
Argentine male boxers
Place of death missing